Korea Open Government License (KOGL, gong-gong nuri) is one of the copyright licenses which allow distributing copyrighted public records. Because in the past there was no standard system about the copyrighted public records, it was a bit complicated that the procedure of getting copyright permission and making inquiry about the licenses. To simplify the complicated procedure and to make the standard system of the copyrighted public records, the Korean Ministry of Culture, Sports and Tourism developed the Korea Open Government License, KOGL.

The license scheme is similar in concept to the Creative Commons licenses.

Types

KOGL has four types. In all cases, users must indicate the source and license of the work, and obey any additional restrictions imposed by the type of license.

When English labels for the three symbols (all present in type 4) are used, they are "BY", "NC" and "ND" respectively.

References

Copyright licenses
Law of South Korea